Sech may refer to:
 Hyperbolic secant, usually abbreviated as sech
 Sich or sech, an administrative and military centre for Cossacks
 Sech, Sultanpur Lodhi, a village in Punjab, India
 Sech (singer), Panamanian singer

See also 
Seč (disambiguation)
Seich (disambiguation)
Setch (disambiguation)
Sich (disambiguation)